The 2011–12 Spanish football season is Sevilla Fútbol Club's 11th consecutive season in La Liga and eighth consecutive playing European competitions since its participation in the 2004–05 UEFA Cup, despite the earlier fall in the Fourth Qualifying Round in August. The team manager in the previous season, Gregorio Manzano, did not continue in the club. During the summer of 2011, Sevilla signed Marcelino as new manager after he unilaterally severed his contract with Racing de Santander. On 6 February, after losing 1–2 at home against Villarreal and after Sevilla earned just two points in its previous seven matches, he was sacked and replaced with Míchel. Finishing in ninth, the team did not qualify for European competition for the first time since 2004.

Trophies balance

Competitive balance

Summer transfers

In

Out

Loan out

Loan return

Loan end

Winter transfers

In

Loan out

Loan return

Current squad

Squad

Youth system

Long-term injuries

Tiberio Guarente's injured leg 
Out between: November 2010 – November 2011
On 6 November 2010, Sevilla's medical services discovered a strange injury in Tiberio Guarente's leg that required treatment. This injury caused that the Italian player was more than 6 months out of the stadiums. He officially played for first time after his injury in San Mamés, against Athletic Bilbao on 8 April 2012, 531 days after his last match.

Jesús Navas' left ankle 
Out between: April 2011 – July 2011

In some training season before the match against Mallorca, Jesús Navas had discomfort in his left ankle, which had been twisted in the beginning of the last session in a Europa League match against PSG. He wasn't called to that match and medical tests were made. It was discovered that he suffered from a relapse of that injury, a stress fracture in his ankle. During the summer holidays Jesus Navas could successfully finish their recovery. He was seen at the usual level in the first pre-season game against UD Roteña.

Arouna Koné's problem of spasms and cold 
Out between: July 2011 – August 2011

After finishing the first pre-season friendly match against UD Roteña the Ivorian player Arouna Koné had to be moved from the emergency to the hospital in Rota Naval Base and then to the Hospital de Jerez de la Frontera for suffering an abrupt spasms box with feeling intense cold and general malaise. According to the club through its website, the player will remain at Jerez de la Frontera to be diagnosed with the disease, evaluating whether or not it is transient and temporary, and replace it. He was discharged two days later but remained under observation at the Hospital in Seville for 48 hours. The player recovered earlier than expected, making it clear that it was a mild condition that could be easily retrieved. Still, the club's medical services recommended a lighter rhythm of training during the preseason to avoid repetition, returning to be one hundred percent in early August.

Frédéric Kanouté's injury in his biceps femoris
Out between: April 2012 – May 2012

During the second half of the match in San Mamés against Athletic Bilbao on 8 April 2012, Frédéric Kanouté felt some discomfort in the hamstring of his right leg that prevented him from playing. He was replaced by Baba Diawara, and medical tests confirmed days later that he suffered a grade II tear in the biceps femoris of the leg, an injury that kept him away from the fields from that matchday until the end of the season. He returned against Rayo Vallecano on Matchday 37, his last match at the Ramón Sánchez Pizjuán as a Sevilla player, scoring a goal.

Called up by their national football team

Match stats

Competitions

Pre-season and friendly tournaments

Friendly matches

4th Antonio Puerta Trophy

66th Teresa Herrera Trophy

La Liga

 Win   Draw   Lost

 Liga BBVA Winner (also qualified for 2012–13 UEFA Champions League Group Stage)
 2012–13 UEFA Champions League Group Stage
 2012–13 UEFA Champions League 4th Qualifying Round
 2012–13 UEFA Europa League Group Stage
 2012–13 UEFA Europa League 4th Qualifying Round 
 2012–13 UEFA Europa League 3rd Qualifying Round
 Relegation to Liga Adelante

With Marcelino

With Míchel

UEFA Europa League

Fourth Qualifying Round

Hannover 96 won 3–2 on aggregate.

Copa del Rey

Round of 32

Sevilla FC won 3–1 on aggregate.

Round of 16

Valencia 2–2 Sevilla on aggregate. Valencia won on away goals.

Others

AFE strike for the first two matchdays 
On 11 August, the Spanish Players' Union, called AFE (Asociación de Futbolistas Españoles, in English, Association of Spanish Footballers) published by a press conference the official announcement of a strike for the first two matchdays of Liga BBVA and Liga Adelante (valid between 11 and 29 August) due to the existence of more than 50 professional footballers who do not charge, a greater number of footballers to whom there's still owed the share of wages in previous months and years and also the existence of discrepancies in the collective agreement. LFP (Liga de Fútbol Profesional), the patronal, grouping the 42 clubs in both categories of Spanish professional football did not understand at first this strike. LFP tried to resolve but it could not help that the opening matchday (to be played the weekend of 20 August) was not played. Seeing that the positions of both parties walked away, LFP began to convene several meetings to negotiate. After 7 meetings, on the morning of 25 August was announced that the strike had been called off thanks to an agreement in principle different AFE requests, among which the extension of a wage guarantee fund that would prevent, or try to avoid a strongest non-payment to the players.
AFE also ceded its claims about the controversial schedules of footballers' holiday, and also said to LFP that they would be able to re-play matchday 1 matches, suspended in the beginning. AFE president, Luis Rubiales, first told to press that these matches wouldn't be played, or in August or ever, talking about a "37-matchdays-Liga BBVA" and a "41-matchdays-Liga Adelante". José Luis Astiazarán, LFP president, announced at the end the calendar reform of both competitions, placing:
 
Liga BBVA matchday 1 on the dates assigned for the matchday 20; and matchday 20 between days 1, 2 and 3 May 2012.
Liga Adelante matchday 1 on 25, 26 and 27 October 2011.

4th Champions for Africa 
Another year, and for the fourth consecutive time, Frédéric Kanouté and his foundation, along with support from UNICEF and other agencies and corporations, have organized this solidary Christmas friendly match in order to help children in Africa, especially Somalia and surrounding nations, in areas such as health and education. This time, Valencia have loaned its stadium, Mestalla, so as to help in this cause. The game was played by two teams composed by players from Liga BBVA, Liga Adelante and some famous people such as the motorcycle road racer Héctor Faubel. One of them, "Africa United", composed mostly by African players, was led by Juan Ignacio Martínez (Levante coach) and Juan Carlos Garrido (former Villarreal coach), and the other one, called "Selección Champions" (in English, Champions Team) and not "Liga BBVA XI" as on previous editions because of the absence of players from Real Madrid and Barcelona and the inclusion of players from the Liga Adelante, which was led by Unai Emery, Valencia coach.

References 

2011-12
Spanish football clubs 2011–12 season
2011–12 UEFA Europa League participants seasons